Daniel Muzito Bagenda (born June 16, 1996) is a Swedish professional ice hockey forward. He is currently playing with AIK of the HockeyAllsvenskan (Allsv).

Playing career
Muzito Bagenda made his Swedish Hockey League debut playing with Modo Hockey during the 2013–14 SHL season.

After four games in the SHL as a junior, Bagenda opted to further his development at the Canadian major junior level with the Mississauga Steelheads of the Ontario Hockey League (OHL). In the 2015–16 season with the Steelheads, Bagenda contributed with 20 goals in 63 games before he was passed over in the 2016 NHL Entry Draft.

On July 3, 2016, Muzito Bagenda signalled the start of his North American professional career, in agreeing to a one-year AHL contract with the Rochester Americans, an affiliate of the Buffalo Sabres.

After two seasons under contract with the Americans, Muzito Bagenda returned to Sweden as a free agent. He agreed to a try-out contract in joining AIK of the HockeyAllsvenskan on August 22, 2018. He made an immediate impact with AIK and was soon signed to a contract for the 2018–19 season. In his first season in the Allsvenskan, Muzito Bagenda used his size and physicality to contribute with 13 goals and 27 points in 52 games.

On April 8, 2019, Muzito Bagenda secured a return to the SHL, signing a two-year contract with Örebro HK.

Career statistics

Regular season and playoffs

International

References

External links

1996 births
Living people
AIK IF players
Cincinnati Cyclones (ECHL) players
Mississauga Steelheads players
Modo Hockey players
IK Oskarshamn players
Sportspeople from Umeå
Rochester Americans players
Swedish ice hockey left wingers
Örebro HK players